Serasan is a village on Serasan Island, Serasan District, Natuna Regency, Indonesia.

References

Natuna Regency
Populated places in Indonesia